Big Black Bugs Bleed Blue Blood is an EP by the Berkeley, California punk rock band The Mr. T Experience, released in 1989 by Rough Trade Records. Lookout! Records re-released the EP as a CD in 1997 with numerous bonus tracks.

Track listing

Performers
Dr. Frank - vocals, guitar
Jon Von Zelowitz - vocals, guitar
Byron Stamatatos - bass
Alex Laipeneiks - drums
Eric Mead - guitar on "T-Shirt Commercial"
Janis Tanaka - bass on "T-Shirt Commercial"
Eban Ostby - drums on "T-Shirt Commercial"

References

The Mr. T Experience EPs
1989 EPs